Stanbridge University is a private for-profit university in California with locations in Irvine, Alhambra, and Riverside. The university offers education in nursing and allied health in Orange County, Los Angeles County, Riverside County, and online. It is accredited by the Accrediting Commission for Career Schools and Colleges, ACCSC.

History 
The university was founded in 1996 and changed its name to Stanbridge University in 2017. Stanbridge University offers undergraduate and graduate programs in nursing, physical therapy, and occupational therapy.

Stanbridge University's flagship campus is located in Irvine, California, and is adjacent to John Wayne Airport. In 2018, Stanbridge University opened its branch campus in Alhambra, CA in Los Angeles County. The Riverside campus received approval from ACCSC and opened in 2021.

The institution's community service initiative, Stanbridge outREACH, has four signature initiatives: environmental rehabilitation, food security, disability community advocacy, and childhood literacy. The initiative was recognized with the Social Responsibility Award by Investors in People in 2021.

Approvals, accreditations, and certifications 
Stanbridge University has been accredited by the Accrediting Commission for Career Schools and Colleges, ACCSC since 2004. Stanbridge University is authorized as an educational institution to award programs of instruction by the State of California Bureau for Private Postsecondary Education.

The entry-level occupational therapy master’s degree program at the Orange County campus is accredited by the Accreditation Council for Occupational Therapy Education. The Riverside and Los Angeles campuses have applied for accreditation and have been granted Candidacy Status by ACOTE. The Occupational Therapy Assistant program is accredited by ACOTE in Orange County and Los Angeles.

The RN to BSN degree completion and the Bachelor of Science in Nursing degree programs are accredited by the Commission on Collegiate Nursing Education.

The Associate of Science in Veterinary Technology degree program is accredited by the American Veterinary Medical Association Committee on Veterinary Technician Education and Activities.

The Physical Therapist Assistant Program at the Orange County and Los Angeles campuses is accredited by the Commission on Accreditation in Physical Therapy Education.

The Associate of Occupational Science in Vocational Nursing program is approved by the California Board of Vocational Nursing and Psychiatric Technicians (BVNPT) at the Orange County and Los Angeles campuses. The Riverside campus is pending BVNPT approval.

References

External links 
 Official website

Universities and colleges in Orange County, California
Educational institutions established in 1996
Nursing schools in California
Private universities and colleges in California
Education in Irvine, California
Universities and colleges in Los Angeles County, California
Education in Riverside, California
Universities and colleges in Riverside County, California
1996 establishments in California